Color Me Blood Red is a 1965 American splatter film written and directed by Herschell Gordon Lewis about a psychotic painter who murders people and uses their blood as paint. It is the third part of what the director's fans have dubbed "The Blood Trilogy," including Blood Feast (1963) and Two Thousand Maniacs! (1964).

Plot 
Artist Adam Sorg is in a creative rut, as none of his pigments can produce the desired shade of red in his paintings. Gigi, Adam's girlfriend, reminds him that he is due at the Farnsworth Galleries for an exhibit. At the gallery, a critic named Gregorovich questions Adam's intent as a painter and derides his use of color. Adam angrily insults him and leaves in a huff, passing Mrs. Carter, an admirer of Sorg's work.

The next day, at Adam's house on the beach, Gigi tells him that Mr. Farnsworth has come to collect a new painting. Adam, who is riding a hydrocycle, pushes Gigi in the water and leaves her to put the cycle away. In the studio, Farnsworth tells Adam that he is inclined to agree with Gregorovich, and asks him if he has any more works in red. Adam punches one of his paintings in frustration, throws the broken frame on the floor, and tells Farnsworth to take any painting and leave. He does so, and Adam takes a shotgun from the wall and pretends to shoot him.

Later, Gigi finds the broken canvas frame on the studio floor and pricks her finger on a nail as she reaches to pick it up, staining it with blood. She bandages her finger and Adam enters the studio. Looking down at the stained canvas, he realizes that this is the red tinge he's been seeking and asks Gigi to reopen her wound. She reluctantly agrees and he immediately begins working on an unfinished painting using her blood. Aghast, she tells him that if he wants blood to use his own, then leaves. Adam cuts his fingers with a razorblade and continues working feverishly until he collapses from anemia.

The following day, Gigi chastises a sullen Adam for his new choice of pigment, and for calling Farnsworth to brag about his new painting that had yet to be finished. Adam responds by stabbing Gigi in the temple with a painting knife, then smears her face against the canvas to complete his work after she falls dead.

The next morning, Mrs. Carter's daughter April tells her mother that she plans to go on a picnic that afternoon with her boyfriend Rolf and two friends, beatniks Jack and Sydney. Later,  after burying Gigi in a secluded spot on the beach, Adam reveals his new painting to Farnsworth, Gregorovich, and Mrs. Carter at the gallery. Gregorovich extols it as Adam's masterpiece. Mrs. Carter offers to buy it and Farnsworth declares its value at $15,000, but Adam insists that it is not for sale. Gregorovich challenges Adam to create another such painting and Adam accepts.

Returning home, Adam prepares to draw blood for his new work of art when he sees April and her friends arrive outside. The four decide to go elsewhere on the beach when they find a couple making out on a blanket just outside Adam's window. The couple stop kissing, and the woman sees Adam's hydrocycles and wants to try riding one. Her boyfriend agrees, but as they venture into the water, Adam speeds toward them in a boat. He harpoons the man in the chest and runs him over, killing him. Later, Adam finishes the painting with blood drained from the woman's eviscerated body.

Adam takes his new painting to the gallery, but again refuses to sell to Mrs. Carter. Adam dolefully asks Gregorovich if he is satisfied and storms out. Gregorovich notes that the painting is still wet.

Sometime later, Mrs. Carter tells April that she wonders about Adam Sorg, since Farnsworth told her that he has sequestered himself in his beach house and hasn't painted for weeks. April tells her mother that she and her friends are taking another trip to the beach, and jokes about posing for one of Sorg's paintings if she meets him.

They drive to the beach, and when April goes to change into her swimsuit near Adam's house, Adam gets her attention and tells her he is looking for a model. When he introduces himself, April tells him that her mother is determined to own one of his works. Adam tells April that if she poses for him, she can have a painting for free. April is unsure about his offer and returns to her friends.

As the group roasts hot dogs that evening, April tells Rolf about meeting Adam and how he offered to paint her likeness. Jack and Sydney run off to play in the surf, and Rolf lets April borrow his car to call the artist from a payphone and refuse his offer. She pulls around to the other side of Adam's house and decides to pose for him after all. Adam has her stand on a stepladder and ties her wrists to a rope suspended over a ceiling beam, telling her that this will help hold her pose.

Elsewhere, Rolf asks Jack and Sydney to find more wood for the fire, and they discover Gigi's decomposing corpse in the sand. Rolf goes to the house to call the police and gets there just in time to stop a crazed Adam from killing April with an axe. He grabs Adam's shotgun from the mantle, but Adam knocks it out of his hands. He declaims that he will immortalize April in his work with her blood, just as he immortalized Gigi. Jack and Sydney suddenly enter, distracting Adam long enough for Rolf to pick up the gun and shoot him in the head. Adam clutches his face and collapses onto a blank canvas.

The scene fades to Farnsworth as he burns one of the grisly paintings behind the gallery. Gregorovich commends him for destroying such works of art, and Farnsworth says that it is Adam Sorg's funeral pyre. Blood oozes from the frame and pools into the burning canvas.

Cast

 Gordon Oas-Heim as Adam Sorg
 Candi Conder as April Carter
 Elyn Warner as Gigi
 Pat Finn-Lee as Patricia Lee
 Jerome Eden as Rolf
 Scott H. Hall as Farnsworth 
 Jim Jaekel as Jack
 Iris Marshall as Mrs. Carter

Production 

During the making of Color Me Blood Red, Lewis and Friedman considered making a fourth "Blood" film to be titled Suburban Roulette. Friedman felt that the "super blood and gore" film market was nearing the saturation point, and decided stop working in the series.

Critical reception 

Allmovie called the film dull and lacking in comparison to Lewis' two previous efforts; "very little distinguishes Color Me Blood Red from its parent productions except a lack of enthusiasm, brashness, and irreverence, something that can't be said for the remainder of Lewis' oeuvre."

See also
List of American films of 1965

References

External links 

 
 

1965 films
1965 horror films
Films directed by Herschell Gordon Lewis
American splatter films
American exploitation films
1960s exploitation films
Films about fictional painters
1960s serial killer films
American slasher films
1960s slasher films
American serial killer films
American psychological horror films
1960s English-language films
1960s American films